Woodgreen Pets Charity was founded in 1924 by Miss Louisa Snow. She had been concerned at the large number of abandoned and injured animals on the streets of London following the First World War. This led to her opening a centre in a house in Lordship Lane, North London.

In 1987 the charity opened its centre in Godmanchester, Cambridge. It has since become one of the largest animal rehoming centres in Europe, with modern facilities for the care of dogs, cats, small and outdoor animals. 

A veterinary surgery and kennels block were built at the charity's Godmanchester centre in 2012. This was largely funded by a gift from a dedicated supporter left in their Will.

In 2020, the charity launched a Pet Collection service which covers North London, Cambridgeshire and Hertfordshire. The service was introduced for owners who need to give up their pets, as well as stray animal intakes. In 2022, the charity rebranded as Woodgreen Pets Charity.

The Dog House
In 2019, the charity was the focus of a Channel Four series, The Dog House. Approximately a million people tuned in to each episode. Series two started on 11 March 2021 and all episodes were made available on All 4.

References 

1924 establishments in England
Charities based in London
Animal charities based in the United Kingdom
Animal welfare organisations based in the United Kingdom
Animal rescue groups
Wood Green
Godmanchester